Lukáš Juliš  (born 2 December 1994) is a Czech professional footballer who plays as a forward for Spanish side Ibiza. He has played for the Czech Republic at youth levels up to under-21. Juliš has played on loan in the Czech First League for Bohemians and Sigma Olomouc, as well as playing at a lower level for the B-side of Sparta Prague.

Club career

Sparta Prague

Reserves
Juliš made ten appearances scoring three goals for Sparta Prague B. He made his league debut on 6 August 2011 in Czech 2. Liga match against SC Znojmo. On 21 August 2011 against FK Varnsdorf, he started the game and scored a hat-trick.

First team
Juliš made his Czech First League debut on 31 July 2013 in a league match against Slavia Prague. He scored his Czech First League first goal on 22 March 2014 in a match against Baník Ostrava.

In the 2017–18 and 2018–19 seasons Juliš suffered several long-term injuries. He spent the spring of 2020 on loan at Sigma Olomouc. He got his confidence back scoring eight league goals  and he returned to Sparta in the summer.

On 5 November 2020, he scored a hat-trick in a 4–1 away win against Celtic in the 2020–21 UEFA Europa League. In the home match against Celtic on 27 November he scored a brace in a second 4–1 win.

UD Ibiza
Juliš joined UD Ibiza of the Segunda División in January 2023, signing a half-season contract.

International career
Juliš has represented his country at various age groups. He was a member of the Czech squad in the 2011 FIFA U-17 World Cup in Mexico, where he was a scorer of both Czech goals. Czech Republic was knocked out in the group phase after one win and two defeats. Juliš represented the Czech Republic in the 2017 UEFA European Under-21 Championship in Poland. The team was knocked out in the group phase after one win and two defeats.

Career statistics

Club

References

External links

Living people
1994 births
People from Chrudim
Sportspeople from the Pardubice Region
Czech footballers
Association football forwards
Czech Republic under-21 international footballers
Czech Republic youth international footballers
Czech First League players
Czech National Football League players
AC Sparta Prague players
Bohemians 1905 players
SK Sigma Olomouc players
UD Ibiza players
Czech expatriate footballers
Czech expatriate sportspeople in Spain
Expatriate footballers in Spain